Surface structure may refer to:
 Surface finish of physical objects
 Surface roughness of physical objects
 Deep structure and surface structure in transformational grammar (in linguistics)